The 2021 W Series Zandvoort round was the sixth and penultimate round of seven in the 2021 W Series, and took place at Circuit Zandvoort in the Netherlands on 4th September 2021. The event was an undercard to the 2021 Formula One World Championship round at the same circuit.

Report

Background
Irina Sidorkova's coronavirus test result at the previous round turned out to be a false positive, and the Russian was let back into the field in time for Zandvoort. Abbi Pulling replaced Caitlin Wood at the Puma W Series Team.

Jamie Chadwick led the championship on 91 points, 7 points ahead of Alice Powell.

Race
There was drama before the start as Bruna Tomaselli spun at Tarzan on the warm-up lap. Because she fell behind Fabienne Wohlwend, who was due to start last following a crash in qualifying, the Brazilian was sent to the back of the grid.

The start of the race was fairly tame, with the only movement towards the front coming from Jessica Hawkins and Abbie Eaton; the pair passing the slow-starting Abbi Pulling through the opening sequence of corners. Pulling also fell victim to Belén García at Tarzan on lap 2, falling from fifth to eighth – however the other García was overambitious heading into the Hugenholzbocht on Vittoria Piria, attempting to cut under the Italian and nearly losing her wing in the process.

Having initially pulled away from Powell and Chadwick on the opening lap, polesitter and Spa winner Emma Kimiläinen was slowly reeled in by the pair of Brits – and Powell made an unconventional yet successful move for the lead at turn 10, with Chadwick following her compatriot through for second half a lap later at Tarzan. Hawkins however had failed to keep in contact with Nerea Martí ahead and began to form a train behind.

The Tatuus–Alfa Romeo F3 T-318 chassis used in the W Series had gained notoriety amongst the other championships it was deployed in for being difficult to race closely, and the nature of the Zandvoort circuit meant that overtaking proved extraordinarily difficult unless drivers made unforced errors. Marta García proved this point by running wide at the Kumhobocht and the Spaniard dropped to the back of the field almost immediately, after which she failed to make up any ground on the field and remained stubbornly stuck behind Tomaselli in 17th.

Alice Powell claimed her third win of the season ahead of Jamie Chadwick in second – the result placing the two drivers level on 109 points at the top of the standings. Kimiläinen was the only other driver still in championship contention with two races left; she had fallen back into the clutches of Martí but the Academy driver did not manage to take third away from the Finn. The only other movement in the field towards the end of the race was a last lap pass from Pulling on Belén García; the Spaniard locking up and running slightly wide of the high line at the Hugenholzbocht which allowed Pulling to pull past on the run up to Scheivlak.

Classification

Practice

Qualifying

Race

Championship standings

Drivers in bold had a mathematical possibility of winning the title.

See also
 2021 Dutch Grand Prix

Notes

References

External links
 Official website
 Race replay

|- style="text-align:center"
|width="35%"|Previous race:
|width="30%"|W Series2021 season
|width="40%"|Next race:

W Series Zandvoort
W Series Zandvoort
Zandvoort
W Series Zandvoort